The Watkinsville lynching was a mass lynching that occurred in Watkinsville, Georgia, United States on June 30, 1905. The lynching, which saw a large mob seize 9 men from a local jail and kill 8 of them by gunfire, has been described as "one of the worst episodes of racial violence ever in Georgia."

History 
In May 1905, a storekeeper named F. M. Holbrook and his wife were murdered in Oconee County, Georgia. In the aftermath, one white man and three African American men were arrested, with the white man accused of the murder and the three African American men accused of being accomplices to the murder. They were held in the jail in Oconee County along with 6 other individuals, all African American men held for various reasons.

According to The Oconee Enterprise, local newspapers at the time praised residents of the county for "not rushing to judgment." However, at midnight on June 29, a large mob of individuals, reportedly from nearby Morgan County, Georgia, organized and traveled to Oconee County. At 2 a.m. on June 30, 1905, this large mob of between approximately 50 and 100 people broke into the Oconee County jail. The mob, consisting of white men, went to the house of the town Marshal and compelled him to take them to the county jail, where the jailer relinquished the keys to the jail cells at gunpoint. Afterwards, they seized 9 of the 10 prisoners, including the murder suspect, and proceeded to tie them to nearby fence posts. One prisoner had apparently avoided the attention of the mob and was left in his cell. Of the 9 men seized by the mob, only one had been convicted of a crime, while the others were awaiting trial. After tying the men to the posts, they proceeded to open fire on the men, with the New-York Tribune reporting that "five volleys" were fired at the men. Eight of the men died as a result of the gunfire, while one man survived and proceeded to play dead.

Following the lynching, several of the bodies were buried in the same grave, leading a historian to say in an interview with CNN that "within an hour of Atlanta is a mass grave". One of the victims, Sandy Price, was identified by his mother, and he is the only victim with an identified grave. A photograph of the dead bodies, still tied to the fence, was taken shortly after the murders.

In 2007, the lynching attracted national attention as part of a story by CNN. Following this, a group that had worked to identify the graves of the victims in the Moore's Ford lynchings, a 1946 lynching that had occurred on the border between Oconee County and Walton County, Georgia, announced that they would work to identify the unmarked graves of the Watkinsville victims. In 2020, on the 115th anniversary of the lynching, a vigil was held in Watkinsville for the victims, with attendees organizing at the former site of the jail and marching to the grave of Sandy Price, where they paid their respects to the victims.

Notes

References

Bibliography

External links 
 

1905 deaths
1905 in Georgia (U.S. state)
1905 murders in the United States
American murder victims
June 1905 events
Lynching deaths in Georgia (U.S. state)
Murdered African-American people
Oconee County, Georgia
People murdered in Georgia (U.S. state)
Racially motivated violence against African Americans
History of racism in Georgia (U.S. state)